Walter Hubchick is a Canadian-American curler. He was the lead on the team that represented the United States at the 1963 Scotch Cup, the men's world curling championship at the time. He and the team of skip Mike Slyziuk, third Nelson Brown, and second Ernie Slyziuk curled out of the Detroit Curling Club from Detroit, Michigan. Hubchick and the US team finished in third place, receiving the bronze medal.

He was originally from Grandview, Manitoba.

References

External links
 

Living people
American male curlers
Date of birth missing (living people)
Year of birth missing (living people)
American curling champions
Canadian people of Ukrainian descent
American people of Ukrainian descent
Canadian emigrants to the United States
People from Parkland Region, Manitoba